The Arsenal Street Bridge is a bridge connecting Arsenal Street in Watertown, Massachusetts to Western Avenue in Allston, Boston, Massachusetts.  It was built in 1925 by the Commonwealth of Massachusetts Metropolitan District Commission.

The bridge and street are named for the nearby Watertown Arsenal.  Western Avenue later crosses the Charles River again into Cambridge, Massachusetts over the Western Avenue Bridge.

History 
The original Arsenal Street Bridge was constructed in 1824.

See also
Arsenal Mall
Watertown Arsenal Historic District
Charles River Bike Path

References

Bridges in Boston
Bridges completed in 1925
Buildings and structures in Watertown, Massachusetts
Road bridges in Massachusetts
1925 establishments in Massachusetts
Bridges over the Charles River
Concrete bridges in the United States
Bridges in Middlesex County, Massachusetts